Tarnowskie Góry  (German: Tarnowitz) is a town in Silesia, southern Poland, located in the Silesian Highlands near Katowice. On the south it borders the Upper Silesian Metropolitan Union, a megalopolis, the greater Silesian metropolitan area populated by about 5,294,000 people. The population of the town is 61,842 (2021). As of 1999, it is part of Silesian Voivodeship, previously Katowice Voivodeship.

The Historic Silver Mine of Tarnowskie Góry, a UNESCO World Heritage Site is located in the town.

Names and etymology

The name of Tarnowskie Góry is derived from Tarnowice, name of a local village and word góry which in Old Polish meant "mines". In a Prussian document from 1750 (published in the Polish language in Berlin by Frederick the Great [1712–1786]), the town is mentioned, among other Silesian towns, as "Tarnowskie Góry". The German name Tarnowitz was introduced in the late 18th century, after the Third Silesian War (between Austria and Prussia). As a result of Germanization of the area, all Polish names received German equivalents (usually closely resembling the original, like Kattowitz for Katowice).

History

Early

The earliest settlements around Tarnowskie Góry date back to over 20 thousand years BC. Traces of the Upper Paleolithic inhabitants were found in village of Rybna, within present-day town borders. During the Bronze Age people lived along the banks of river Stoła (Polish) or Stola, (name derived from German Stollenwasser Adit water earlier this river was known as "Rybna" (derived from a Polish word for "fish"), their tools, jewelry and weapons were excavated here, dating from between the 8th and 5th centuries BC. Silver, lead and zinc were bountiful in these grounds and the evidence of an early metal production dates back to at least 3rd century AD.

Medieval and Renaissance

In the Middle Ages the region was inhabited by Lechitic Polish tribes, and in the 10th century it became part of the emerging Polish state under its first ruler Mieszko I of Poland. Repty Śląskie, a village, now within Tarnowskie Góry's town limits, was mentioned in an official papal document dating from September 12, 1201. The present-day district of Stare Tarnowice was the location of a motte-and-bailey castle from the 14th century, which is now an archaeological site. According to legend, the source of silver ore (solely responsible for the town's existence) was first discovered in 1490, when local peasant-farmer named Rybka found a strange, heavy, metallic stone while plowing the field near village of Tarnowice. He presented his find to a local priest and within less than three decades this place became the largest silver mining center in the area. Its population rivaled in size some of the major cities of the Renaissance world and prospectors were coming from all corners of the continent, some as far as Spain, all of this fueled by the massive amount and quality of ore, so high that on many occasions it was said to be practically pure, metallic silver.

Initial growth can be attributed to Jan II the Good, the last Duke of Opole and Racibórz of the first Polish dynasty of Piast, and George, Margrave of Brandenburg-Ansbach (from the House of Hohenzollern), both of whom, in 1526, gave the town special privileges called "Akt Wolności Górniczej" (The Miners’ Freedom Act). This revolutionary document awarded freedom to any peasant who chose to become a miner in the area; the same year new settlement was officially elevated to the town-status, christened Tarnowskie Góry and received additional set of town privileges and rights, cote of arms and official seal followed few decades later in 1562.

In 1528, "Ordunek Górny" (the Mining Ordinance) strongly promoting farther exploration and offering a high percentage of profits to miners, was proclaimed and sparked a period of an explosive growth and prosperity. Many other associated businesses like trade, manufacturing, crafts etc., were rapidly developing and most of the old-town was already in place by 1540, including many of still existing brick and stone buildings and Protestant church.

Many Protestants found refuge in Tarnowskie Góry, and after the death of John II the Good (1532) town was ruled by the family of Hohenzollern, supporters of reformation movement. The first Protestant, wooden church was built in 1529 and two years later a stone structure was erected to replace it. In 1531, Szkola Różnowiercza (The Reformation School) was created and at the end of the 16th century was run by Daniel Franconius, famous scholar, educator, poet, and a propagator of Arianism.

Enlightenment

The prosperity of Tarnowskie Góry was abruptly halted by the Thirty Year War (1618–1648), and in 1676–77 its population was farther decimated by an outbreak of plague (which two years later reached the Austrian capital). In 1683, Polish King John III Sobieski rested in town on his way to the Battle of Vienna (where he led the famous Hussars branch of Polish cavalry to victory in defeating the Ottoman army and stopping the progress of their European invasion). In Tarnowskie Góry, Polish nobility welcomed the newly elected kings Augustus II the Strong and Augustus III of Poland, in July 1697 and January 1734, respectively, when they were heading for their royal coronations to Kraków.

December 16, 1740, was marked by the Prussian army entering the town during the first of the Silesian Wars; in 1742, Austrian domination ended and Tarnowskie Góry fell under Prussian rule. In 1742, after the end of Austrian rule, a Lutheran parish was established, whose first pastor was Polish religious writer and author of popular prayer-books Samuel Ludwik Zasadius. Around 1780 Friedrich Wilhelm von Reden opened a government-controlled mine as well as silver and lead foundry named "Frederyk" after Frederick William II, the king of Prussia.

Jews, with a few exceptions, were restricted or altogether banned from the area throughout the years; yet still they managed to have a great impact on the entire region's progress. Salomon Isaac, Jewish trade-agent and mining entrepreneur, was one of the greatest contributors to the development of the Sillesian metallurgical and mining industries and, ultimately, become one of the managing officers of the newly formed Prussian Office of Mining in Tarnowskie Góry.

Industrial Revolution

In 1788, sparking the onset of the Industrial Revolution the first steam engine in continental Europe (and only the second one in the world) was imported from England and installed with a purpose of draining the underground waters. This was not a small task, miles of a deep adit or drainage-tunnel. A 600-metre part of former Fryderyk adit is a tourist route named Black Trout Adit. Its tunnels were cut through a solid bedrock and one of the system outlets, near Repty, became the main contributory of river Drama.

Although Napoleonic Wars damaged and put a burden of heavy taxation on it, the town experienced another boom of growth and prosperity in the 19th century. In 1803 one of world's first schools of mining was initiated and, during following few decades, many new factories and businesses opened including: paper mill, iron foundry, printing shop, brewery, soap factory and natural gas production plant. During that period, the town square and two main streets were paved, gas lighting illuminated the town and a sewage system was installed. "Górnośląska Spółka Bracka" (The Upper-Silesian Brotherhood Cooperative) was organized with its headquarters in Tarnowskie Góry; (this revolutionary institution functioned as an insurance company for miners and covered the entire Upper Silesian region with 17,821 initial members). In 1857 the first railroad, leading to Opole, reached the town and eight years later Warsaw–Vienna line cut-through as well. Throughout the next few decades, because of its strategic location, the number of railroad lines grew rapidly, and by the end of the 19th century Tarnowskie Góry was well on its way to becoming the second largest marshaling yard in Europe. Poles smuggled large amounts of gunpowder through the town to the Russian Partition of Poland during the January Uprising in 1863. In 1873 a new county was formed in the area with Tarnowskie Góry as its capital; a hospital and court building were opened soon after.

Modern

In the beginning of the 20th century, the source of the silver ore dried out and the mining stopped completely. After World War I ended, between 1919 and 1921 three massive anti-German uprisings took place in entire Upper Silesian region and many of towns residents fought and supported the cause. Soon after the end of the third one, mandated by the Versailles Treaty, the Silesian Plebiscite was held, and an overwhelming majority of the Upper Silesia region voted for integration with newly independent Poland; in Tarnowskie Góry however, 82% of the participants favored Germany in large part due to "imported" votes. In 1922, after over 300 years of Austrian and Prussian domination, Tarnowskie Góry was returned to Poland. In the interwar period the 11th Infantry Regiment of the Polish Army was stationed in Tarnowskie Góry.

At the onset of World War II in September 1939, Poland was invaded by Germany and Nazi German occupation began. On September 6–8, 1939, the Einsatzgruppe II entered the town to commit various crimes against Poles. Mass searches of Polish organizations, offices and houses, and mass arrests of priests, teachers, intelligentsia and fighters of three anti-German, Silesian Uprisings (1919–1921) took place. The synagogue was burned while German minority enthusiastically welcomed invading Nazi forces. Already in September 1939, the Germans murdered over 20 Poles in the present-day districts of Lasowice, Strzybnica and Repty Śląskie. Among the victims were miners, former insurgents and a school principal from nearby Chorzów. Germany established and operated a prison for Poles in the town. During the occupation, the Armia Krajowa (Home Army, the leading Polish underground resistance organization) undertook a sabotage campaign against Nazi forces, railroad-transport and local industry. The Germans operated two forced labour subcamps of the Stalag VIII-B/344 prisoner-of-war camp in the town. Liberation of Silesia came in early 1945; in order to save the industrial infrastructure of the region, the Red Army opened an offensive supported by massive numbers of troops with minimal use of heavy artillery and air-bombardment. According to witnesses, the entire operation was extremely fast; countless, shoulder-to-shoulder, crowds of Russian soldiers passed through the town in matter of minutes followed by almost complete still.

Recent

The decades following the end of World War II saw an influx of immigrants from other parts of Poland (including its former eastern provinces) to take over property of expelled German inhabitants, and as a result of planned-economy developments. Several large factories opened in Tarnowskie Góry's area including: FASER (the largest manufacturer of safety equipment and mining lamps in Soviet bloc), FAZOS (the manufacturer of automated mine-wall reinforcements), ZAMET (manufacturer of metallurgical equipment), CHEMET (manufacturer of chemical equipment), and Lead and Zinc Mill Miasteczko Slaskie (the second largest facility of this kind in Europe). All of these "Molochs" employed thousands of workers and emitted countless pollutants into the surrounding environment. For decades the railroad industry remained one of the largest local employers, however, due to an aging infrastructure, it slowly decreased in volume and other cities of the area begun to handle more and more of the rail traffic in terms of both cargo and passenger trains.

The fall of Iron Curtain in 1989 brought freedom back to Poland accompanied by the chaos of restructuring and privatization, which led to a small but steady decline of population, beginning in mid-1990s and lasting throughout the first decade of the 21st century. Today, Tarnowskie Góry is an industrial, cultural, educational, and technological center and tourist destination.

Places and attractions

 Historical Mine Of Silver Ores, a UNESCO World Heritage Site.
 Black Trout Adit, one of Poland's official national Historic Monuments, as designated May 1, 2004. Its listing is maintained by the National Heritage Board of Poland.
 Town Square (Rynek), adorned by string of old romantic Renaissance arcade buildings, a 17th-century Protestant church, the building of the town's first pharmacy and crowned by an impressive town hall; it is spotted with shops, bars, restaurants etc., including the Sedlaczek Wine House, a charming restaurant and tavern opened in 1786, located in a 16th-century building which hosted many renowned people including Polish kings John III Sobieski, Augustus II the Strong, Augustus III, Russian tsar Alexander I and German poet Goethe, also housing the Tarnowskie Góry Museum, opened in 1958.
 Upper Silesia Narrow Gauge Railways – the world's oldest narrow gauge railway in continuous service since 1853 
 16th-century Gwareks' bell-tower ("Gwarek" an old-Polish reference to miners).
 Church of Saints Peter and Paul, built in the 16th century in the Renaissance style, and later rebuilt in Romanesque Revival style.
 Renaissance Stare Tarnowice Castle, located in the Stare Tarnowice district
 Baroque architecture-Classicist Rybna Palace, located in the Rybna district
 Gwarki Tarnogórskie – since 1957 this annual event and out-door fest, held in first half of September, commemorates and celebrates mining-culture of the region; including: historical-costume parade, outdoor concerts, regional food-concessions and other entertainment and sporting events.
 Water Park, large recreational complex which includes in and outdoor pools, sports pool, sea-wave pool, rapid river, water slides, Jacuzzi and brine bath.
Originated in the mid-19th century by Donnersmarck family in an effort to create private hunting grounds and to preserve natural ecology of the region; (due to rapid industrial and agricultural expansion the environment of Upper Silesia was dramatically changing and disappearing; plant species from entire Silesian region were brought-in to recreate the original pre-industrial landscape along the banks of romantic Drama river valley. The park includes Black Trout Adit with two entrances, "Ewa" and "Sylwester" available to the public, Upper-Silesian Rehabilitation Center "Repty", and variety of plant and animal habitats that are unique to the region.
 Classicist Karłuszowiec Palace Complex, located in Karłuszowiec, within the Śródmieście-Centrum district, now housing an art school
 Castles, palaces and historical churches – Tarnowskie Góry is surrounded by such a structures that include: Brynek, Kamieniec, Kopienica, Łubie, Miedary-Kopanina, Nakło Śląskie, Szałsza, Świerklaniec, Tworóg, Wilkowice and Zbrosławice. Many of lavish residences and palaces belonged to Donnersmarck family (after Krupp the second richest in 19th and early 20th century Europe)
 Świerklaniec – located within a bicycle-trip distance from Tarnowskie Góry, this  spectacular park claims to be the only, pure English-style Park in continental Europe; once a home to a 19th-century palace, the main residence of Donnersmarck family, and fully preserved Piast dynasty medieval castle (both structures destroyed during World War II and the post-war Soviet era). Grandiose palace sometimes called "miniature Versailles" was built by Guido Henckel von Donnersmarck for his mistress Pauline Thérèse Lachmann, the most successful of 19th-century French courtesans, also known as "La Paiva", who later became his wife Countess Henckel von Donnersmarck and died here in 1884. All building materials as well as artists, sculptors and labor involved in erecting this structure were imported from France. Today Świerklaniec Park is open to public however only romantic guest house and set of magnificent fountains and sculptures remain from palatial complex that once stood here. During the sixties large, man-made lake was added to the north.

Notable people

John II the Good (1460–1532), Duke of Opole, last one of the Opole line of the Piast dynasty, co-founder of Tarnowskie Góry.
George, Margrave of Brandenburg-Ansbach (1484–1543), from the House of Hohenzollern, co-founder of Tarnowskie Góry.
George Frederick, Margrave of Brandenburg-Ansbach (1539–1603), from the House of Hohenzollern, who gave a coat of arms to Tarnowskie Góry.
Rudolf von Carnall (1804–1874), engineering geologist
Donnersmarck family, for over two centuries owners of most of the town and surrounding lands.
Salomon Isaac (1730–1794), Jewish trade agent and mining entrepreneur, one of the founders of Upper Silesian mining and metallurgical industries
Stefan Jurkowski (born 1948), poet, publicist, literary critic, journalist
Donat Kirsch (born 1953), author, novelist and essayist
Alexander Kohut (1865–1967), talmudist and orientalist, rabbi of Tarnowitz
Andrzej Korosiewicz (born 1972), musician and poet
Pauline Thérèse Lachmann, Countess Henckel von Donnersmarck, also known as La Païva (1819–1884), the most successful of 19th-century French courtesans
Michał Lewek (1878–1967), Roman Catholic priest
Bolesław Lubosz (1928–2001), poet, essayist and translator
Martin Max (born 1968), German footballer
Krzysztof Miller (born 1962), photographer, camera operator and filmmaker
Jan Miodek (born 1946), linguist
Paweł Musioł (1905–1943), politician, educator, publicist and historian of Silesian literature
Dariusz Świercz (born 1994), chess grandmaster
Józef Wandzik (born 1963), footballer
Martin Websky (1824–1886), German mineralogist who discovered and described a variation of Aragonite and named it "Tarnowicyt" (from Tarnowskie Góry)
Carl Wernicke (1848–1905), physician and neuropathologist
Jolanta Wilk (born 1961), actress
Robert Wojsyk (born 1990), footballer
Klaus Wyrtki (1925–2013), geophysicist
Łukasz Żelezny (born 1981), composer and DJ

Twin towns – sister cities

Tarnowskie Góry is twinned with:

 Békéscsaba, Hungary
 Bernburg, Germany
 Kutná Hora, Czech Republic
 Méricourt, France

References

External links

Municipal website
Tarnowskie Góry – Portal
Tarnowskie Góry – Cultural Events
Tarnowskie Góry – Portal Informacyjny (Polish)
Jewish Community in Tarnowskie Góry on Virtual Shtetl
Wojciech Korfanty's proclamation after plebiscite
Exact plebiscite results – according to villages and districts (German)
1920 map showing German territory's changes, including marked area for the Upper Silesia plebiscite
Map of interwar Poland; shows plebiscite areas

Cities and towns in Silesian Voivodeship
Tarnowskie Góry County
Silesian Voivodeship (1920–1939)
Archaeological sites in Poland
Nazi war crimes in Poland